Moe's Newport Restaurant is located in the Westboro area of Ottawa, Ontario, Canada, at the corner of Churchill and Scott.  It had previously been located at the corner of Richmond and Churchill. Moe's is known for its pizza and Lebanese cuisine menu.

Moe's was founded by Moe Atallah, a Lebanese refugee who fled his homeland in 1976. In Lebanon, Atallah managed his family's restaurant on the Mediterranean coast. His first job in Canada was as a dishwasher for a Greek restaurant on Rideau Street. He worked for a number of local restaurants, including another local institution: the Colonnade pizzeria on Metcalfe Street. He purchased the Newport in 1988, turning the diner into a local landmark and highly successful enterprise. Atallah now owns a number of restaurants around Ottawa.

Attalah is also a well known philanthropist, having raised hundreds of thousands of dollars for local charities. Every Christmas morning, Atallah allows the less fortunate to have breakfast and lunch at the Newport for free. Hundreds of gifts are also donated from the public to the Newport for this special occasion.

Attalah is a co-founder, along with the late Canadian journalist and good friend Earl McRae, of the Elvis Sighting Society, a philanthropic organization that often holds events at the restaurant. The walls of the Newport are decorated with Elvis memorabilia and pictures, originally inspired by McRae being a well-known fan of the late singer. Nowadays, Atallah himself has a great fondness for Elvis as well. In recognition of the society and the Newport, the small lane behind the original restaurant has been officially dubbed "Elvis Lives Lane" by Ottawa City Council.

The restaurant is also notable as the workplace of Heather Crowe, a longtime waitress at the Newport who was diagnosed with lung cancer. Having never smoked, the cancer was credited to the many years of exposure to secondhand smoke in the Newport, and other restaurants that she had worked in over a forty-year career. It was at the Newport that she met a Health Canada director who helped make her a spokesperson for the campaign against secondhand smoke, which included appearance in television commercials across Canada. Atallah also appeared in a series of public awareness commercials, discussing how unaware restaurant owners were about the dangers of secondhand smoke, and how smoking had been banned by the Newport after Crowe's diagnosis.

The restaurant also runs the kiosk and patio at Kitchissippi beach nearby.

See also
 List of Lebanese restaurants

References
"Restaurant subdued after death of no-smoking crusader:;" Graham Hughes. The Vancouver Sun. Vancouver, B.C.: May 24, 2006. pg. A.16
"Crowe wants to experience smoke-free future;" Ron Corbett. The Ottawa Citizen. Ottawa, Ont.: Apr 9, 2006. pg. A.11
"'He just gives and gives and gives': Moe Atallah recognized for community commitment;" Kristin Goff. The Ottawa Citizen. Ottawa, Ont.: Nov 30, 2002. pg. H.3
"Worshipping the King in Westboro: Restaurateur Moe Atallah tells Ken Gray why Elvis is like God to him.;" Ken Gray. The Ottawa Citizen. Ottawa, Ont.: Dec 23, 2000. pg. D.7

External links
 Official site

Lebanese-Canadian culture
Lebanese restaurants
Restaurants in Ottawa